Schrebera is a genus of plant in the family Oleaceae found in Peru, tropical and southern Africa, India and Southeast Asia.  the World Checklist of Selected Plant Families recognises 8 species:

 Schrebera alata (Hochst.) Welw. - eastern and southern Africa from Ethiopia to Eswatini
 Schrebera americana (Zahlbr.) Gilg - Peru
 Schrebera arborea A.Chev. - tropical Africa from Senegal to Kenya, south to Angola
 Schrebera capuronii Bosser & R.Rabev. - Madagascar
 Schrebera kusnotoi Kosterm. - Borneo
 Schrebera orientalis Bosser & R.Rabev. - Madagascar
 Schrebera swietenioides Roxb. - India, Himalayas, Indochina
 Schrebera trichoclada Welw. - eastern and central Africa (Tanzania, Zaire, Mozambique, Angola, etc.)

References

 
Oleaceae genera